Gerbilliscus is a genus of rodent in the subfamily Gerbillinae (gerbils) of the family Muridae. It contains the following species, all native to Africa:
 Cape gerbil (Gerbilliscus afra)
 Boehm's gerbil (Gerbilliscus boehmi)
 Highveld gerbil (Gerbilliscus brantsii)
 Guinean gerbil (Gerbilliscus guineae)
 Gorongoza gerbil (Gerbilliscus inclusus)
 Kemp's gerbil (Gerbilliscus kempi)
 Bushveld gerbil (Gerbilliscus leucogaster)
 Black-tailed gerbil (Gerbilliscus nigricaudus)
 Phillips's gerbil (Gerbilliscus phillipsi)
 Fringe-tailed gerbil (Gerbilliscus robustus)
 Savanna gerbil (Gerbilliscus validus)

Species currently classified in this genus were formerly treated in the genus Tatera.

References

 
Rodent genera
Taxa named by Oldfield Thomas